Venerable María del Pilar Cimadevilla López-Dóriga, called Pilina, (February 17, 1952 - March 6, 1962) was a Spanish girl who is being considered for sainthood by the Roman Catholic Church. The Congregation for the Causes of Saints declared her "heroic virtues" on April 19, 2004. A certified miracle is required for her to be beatified and a second certified miracle would be required for her to be canonized as a saint. She is currently known as a Venerable.

She was born in Madrid February 17, 1952 to Colonel Amaro Cimadevilla and María del Rosario López-Dóriga and was noted for her piety, docility of spirit, and her intelligence. At the age of nine, she developed Hodgkin's lymphoma and was treated at the military hospital of Madrid, staffed by nuns devoted to the Missionaries of the Sick. Pilina was inspired to offer up her own suffering in hope of helping others who were ill. Her illness caused her spirit and her faith to mature rapidly. She died in her mother's arms on March 6, 1962. After her death, her supporters began to promote her cause for sainthood.

References

External links 
Pilina.net

1952 births
1962 deaths
Roman Catholic child venerables
Deaths from Hodgkin lymphoma
People from Madrid
Spanish children
Spanish Roman Catholics
Deaths from cancer in Spain
Venerated Catholics by Pope John Paul II